State Road 100 (SR 100) is a  east–west highway serving northeast Florida. The portion west of Lake City is only signed as portions of US 41 and US 129, both of which run north–south.

Route description

The northernmost  of SR 100 are signed (north–south) as US 129. For  in Jasper, it merges with US 41 (SR 25) before separating from US 129 (which has the hidden Florida Department of Transportation designation SR 51 between the split and Live Oak).

East of Lake City, SR 100 is signed east–west as it continues along a northwest–southeast pathway toward the Atlantic Ocean, serving, amongst other municipalities, Lake Butler, Starke, Keystone Heights, and Putnam Hall before merging with US 17 (hidden SR 15) on Reid Street in Palatka, just west of their bridge crossing at St. Johns River.

State Road 100 separates from US 17/SR 15 in San Mateo and continues in a more easterly direction through Shell Bluff, Bimini, Bunnell (where SR 100 overlaps U.S. Route 1/SR 5 for a mile) and Palm Coast before it reaches SR A1A in Flagler Beach on the Atlantic coast.

Major intersections

Related routes
State Road 100 contains a total of five suffixed alternates in three counties.

Bradford County

County Road 100A can be found in two locations outside of Starke, Florida. The first segment is southeast of Starke on the east side of the road. It begins as Southeast Creek 100A running northeast until after the intersection with Southeast 125th Terrace, where it then turns north, winding around the farmland east of the city. Further north it crosses a railroad line at the intersection with Southeast 142nd Street. Before the intersection with Southeast 144th Street, it makes a sharp left turn where it later intersects unmarked County Road 230A, a suffixed route of State Road 230. The road continues westward to cross the same railroad line and terminates back at SR 100, but 144th Street continues westward toward Southeast Eighth Street, which crosses the CSX Wildwood Subdivision, and turns right onto Alexander Road leading to US 301.

The second County Road 100A begins at US 301 as Edwards Road and runs west. From Orange Avenue it continues straight west until after it crosses a bridge over a tributary to Alligator Creek, where it leaves the city limits and approaches another railroad line that terminates at the CSX Wildwood Subdivision, and then curves to the southwest. Eventually it makes a reverse J-hook curve to the north where it crosses the aforementioned railroad line, running through the forests west of the city before re-entering the city limits where it curves to the northeast and terminates at its parent route.

County Road 100A1

County Road 100A1 is signed as CR 100A, and has no connection to SR 100, but it is officially recognized as CR 100A1. The road begins as a dirt road south of the city that crosses a creek leading to Lake Rowell and becomes paved. That paved section runs north between US 301 and the CSX Wildwood Subdivision. The road doesn't enter the city limits until north of Southeast 145th Terrace, and finally terminates at US 301.

Union County

County Road 100A is located northwest of Lake Butler. It begins at SR 100 northwest of the bridge over Swift Creek, and heads northeast into County Road 231.

Columbia County

County Road 100A is known as Northwest Bascom Norris Drive, and Northeast Bascom Norris Drive. It begins at the southeast end of the concurrency of SR 100 with US 90 (SR 10) in Watertown, east of Lake City as Northeast Bascom Norris Drive. From there it runs north of US 90, intersecting with US 441 (SRs 25A/47) where it becomes Northwest Bascom Norris Drive, and eventually terminates at US 41 (SRs 25/100), where it also rejoins its parent route.

References

100
100
100
100
100
100
100
100
Palm Coast, Florida